Prince Nyarko (born ) is a Ghanaian male weightlifter, competing in the 85 kg category and representing Ghana at international competitions. He participated at the 2014 Commonwealth Games in the 85 kg event.

Major competitions

References

1995 births
Living people
Ghanaian male weightlifters
Place of birth missing (living people)
Weightlifters at the 2014 Commonwealth Games
Commonwealth Games competitors for Ghana
20th-century Ghanaian people
21st-century Ghanaian people